Marie Thérèse Wouters ( – ) was a Belgian translator in the 18th century. She is known for her work translating English-language literature into French, often in collaboration with her sister Cornélie Wouters de Vassé.

Biography 
Her dates of birth and death are unconfirmed, although one source cites her baptismal date as October 20, 1739, and she was alive at least as late as 1802. She was one of at least seven children born in Brussels to Jacques Corneille and Catherine Marguerite Wouters.

Wouters moved to Paris around the early 1780s. She is best known for her translations of English literature into French, often completed in collaboration with her sister Cornélie Wouters. Her work was highly regarded by her contemporaries, and she received recognition in the Mercure de France.

Selected works 

 Traduction du théâtre anglois depuis l'origine des spectacles jusqu'à nos jours, divisée en trois époques, Paris, Veuve Ballard et fils, 12 vol., (with Cornélie Wouters), 1784–1787.
 Nelson, ou l'Avare puni, 3 vol., 1798.

References 

1739 births
1802 deaths
Translators from English
Translators to French
Writers of the Austrian Netherlands
French women writers
Belgian translators
French translators
Women of the Austrian Netherlands